"The Real Thing" is a song by English singer Tony Di Bart, released in 1993 and re-released in March 1994. The song topped both the UK Singles Chart and the UK Dance Singles Chart following its 1994 re-release, and it also became a top-20 hit in Belgium, France, Ireland, and Spain the same year. In 1996, it was included on Di Bart's only album, Falling for You.

Background and release
Di Bart was working as a bathroom salesman in Buckinghamshire when he recorded and released "The Real Thing". It was written by Di Bart, Andy Blissett and Lucinda Drayton. Originally released in 1993, the song failed to appear on the UK Singles Chart. However, a remixed version was released on 28 March 1994 and spent a week at number one on the UK Singles Chart in May 1994. This remix also found success in countries outside the UK, becoming a top-20 hit in Belgium, France, Ireland, and Spain. It also reached the top 50 in Germany and the Netherlands. In North America, it peaked at number 35 on the US Billboard Hot Dance Club Play chart and number three on the Canadian RPM Dance/Urban chart.

Critical reception
Alexis Petridis from The Guardian said that "The Real Thing" "is an authentically fantastic pop record: in a world of euphoria, it sounded strangely wistful and muted, its melancholy chafing against its plasticky bedroom production." James Masterton described the song as "a pleasant, poppy piece of soul" in his weekly UK chart commentary. Pan-European magazine Music & Media wrote, "It's the combination of the fast basslinelike Grandmaster Flash's 'White Lines' with Di-Bart's slow soulful vocals that does it." Radio Number One FM/Istanbul programmer Alpay Kasicki stated that this type of pop dance happens to be very popular in Turkey, "We try to cover everything, but this is the people's taste. It was played 25 times in its first two weeks on our playlist. I'm sure Di-Bart will follow in the footsteps of Haddaway and Culture Beat." Andy Beevers from Music Weeks RM Dance Update said about the 1994 remix, "They retain the excellent catchy vocals and back them up wlth a more complete club track. It builds from an almospheric piano and synth intro with leasing snatches of beats into a driving epic with blg breakdowns." Another editor, James Hamilton, described it as "last autumn's mournfully moaned light floater now faster like its old B-side in blippily swirled plonking fluttery 0-128.8bpm Joy Brothers Remake".

Impact and legacy
The Guardian included "The Real Thing" in their "60 years of No 1 singles – The best No 1 records" in 2012.

Tomorrowland featured the song in their official list of "The Ibiza 500" in 2020.

Track listings
1993 release
 UK 12-inch blue vinyl singleA1. "The Real Thing"
B1. "The Real Thing" (dance mix)
B2. "The Real Thing" (underground mix)

1994 release

 UK 7-inch singleA. "The Real Thing" (new 7-inch dance)
B. "The Real Thing" (new 7-inch radio)

 UK 12-inch singleA1. "The Real Thing" (The Joy Brothers remake)
B1. "The Real Thing" (7-inch remake)
B2. "The Real Thing" (original dance mix)

 UK CD single "The Real Thing" (new 7-inch dance)
 "The Real Thing" (new 7-inch radio)
 "The Real Thing" (new 12-inch dance)
 "The Real Thing" (original 12-inch dance)
 "The Real Thing" (12-inch dub mix)

 Dutch 12-inch singleA1. "The Real Thing" (house mix) – 6:32
B1. "The Real Thing" (new 12-inch dance mix) – 7:17
B2. "The Real Thing" (dub underground mix) – 5:15

 French CD single "The Real Thing" (new dance mix) – 3:51
 "The Real Thing" (new radio mix) – 3:54

 Spanish maxi-CD single'
 "The Real Thing" (new 7-inch dance)
 "The Real Thing" (original 12-inch dance)
 "The Real Thing" (12-inch dub mix)
 "The Real Thing" (new 12-inch dance)
 "The Real Thing" (new 7-inch radio)

Charts

Weekly charts

Year-end charts

Certifications

References

1993 songs
1993 debut singles
1994 singles
Music Week number-one dance singles
Number-one singles in Scotland
Tony Di Bart songs
UK Singles Chart number-one singles